The northern pale-hipped skink (Celatiscincus similis) is a species of lizard in the family Scincidae. It is endemic to New Caledonia.

References

Celatiscincus
Skinks of New Caledonia
Endemic fauna of New Caledonia
Reptiles described in 2006
Taxa named by Ross Allen Sadlier
Taxa named by Sarah A. Smith
Taxa named by Aaron M. Bauer